Kindee is a town in New South Wales, Australia.

References 

Towns in New South Wales
Mid North Coast